The Blättersberg near Rhodt unter Rietburg in the Rhenish-Palatine county of Südliche Weinstraße is a mountain, in the Palatine Forest in the German state of Rhineland-Palatinate.

The mountain has a north summit (613.2 m) and a south summit (606.0 m); on the latter is the Ludwig observation tower.

Geography

Location 
The Blättersberg lies in the Haardt, the eastern mountain chain of the Palatine Forest, in the eponymous nature park. Its summit rises 3 kilometres west-northwest of Rhodt unter Rietburg, within whose territory most of the mountain lies, 4.5 km west-southwest of  Edenkoben, between the Edenkoben valley in the north and the Modenbach valley in the south, and 1.6 km (all as the crow flies) northwest of the village of Weyher in der Pfalz. The mountain can be clearly made out from the Rhine Plain. On its east-northeastern flank, to the west and above the stately home of Villa Ludwigshöhe that is visible for miles, is the castle of Rietburg (Rhodt), which is also a landmark. At the southern foot of the mountain, by the upper reaches of the Modenbach stream, lies the historic estate of the Buschmühle mill.

Elevation 
The elevation of the Blättersberg is given on some topographic maps as 613.2 m, but on others as 618 m. About 60 metres south-southeast of the summit is another high point, 611.8 m.

Ludwig Tower 
On the southern summit of the Blätterberg stands an observation tower, built in 1883, called the Ludwig Tower (Ludwigsturm). From the viewing platform of the 15 metre-high tower the view to the east into the Rhine Plain is blocked by the trees, but elsewhere one can see as far as the  Badener Höhe and Hornisgrinde in the Black Forest to the south-southeast, nearby Trifels Castle to the southwest, the Frankenweide forest with its hills, the Weißenberg (Luitpold Tower) and Hortenkopf (transmission mast) to the west, the nearby Kesselberg mountain to the northwest and the highest point in the Palatine Forest, the Kalmit, to the north-northeast.

Transport links 
The Blättersberg and the Ludwig Tower may be reached from the top station of the chair lift near Villa Ludwigshöhe (530.8 m) or from the Hüttenbrunnen hiker's car park in the Edenkobener valley above the Kohlplatz. Numerous hiking trails run through the local countryside.

Gallery

References

External links 
 Blättersberg (Walking guide)
 Around the Blättersberg 

Südliche Weinstraße
Mountains and hills of the Palatinate Forest
Mountains under 1000 metres
Mountains and hills of Rhineland-Palatinate